The Williams–Wright Award is an award that honors extraordinary or outstanding work in spectroscopic measurements while working in an industrial setting. The award has been given by the Coblentz Society annually since 1978 with the Awardee being selected by a committee of leading spectroscopists. The Award citations reads, "The Coblentz Society proudly presents the Williams–Wright Award to  ---  for his/her outstanding contributions to the Field of Industrial Spectroscopy."

The Williams–Wright Award is presented at the Pittsburgh Conference on Analytical Chemistry and Applied Spectroscopy, familiarly known as Pittcon, and the largest annual conference on analytical chemistry and applied spectroscopy.

Recipients
Source: CoblenzSociety

See also

 List of business and industry awards
 List of chemistry awards
 List of prizes named after people

References

External links
Coblentz Society
Previous winners

Chemistry awards
American science and technology awards
Awards established in 1978
1978 establishments in the United States